The list of National Highways according to new numbering in Punjab, India. There are 3274 kilometers of National Highways across the state of Punjab.

List of National Highways in Punjab, India

References

 
Punjab, India-related lists
Punjab